Chaouki is an Arabic masculine given name. People with the name include:

First name
 Chaouki Abdallah, Lebanese-American engineer and academic
 Chaouki Chamoun (born 1942), Lebanese artist
 Chaouki Dries (born 1981), Algerian rower
 Chaouki Ben Khader (born 2001) is a Tunisian football player
 Chaouki Ben Saada (born 1984), Tunisian football player
 Chaouki Sammari (born 1972), Tunisian wrestler

Middle name
 Mohammed Chaouki Zine (born 1972), Algerian philosopher and writer

Arabic masculine given names